Thallyson Gabriel Lobo Seabra (born 24 March 1996) is a Brazilian footballer who plays for Confiança as a central midfielder.

Club career
Born in Recife, Thallyson joined the youth academy of Sport Club do Recife in 2014 after having passed through the youth setup of Paraná Clube. At the beginning of the 2017 season, he was promoted to the senior team and made his debut in Campeonato Pernambucano, playing the whole ninety minutes of a 0–0 draw against Salgueiro Atlético Clube.

On 5 August 2017, he scored his first goal for the club in a 3–1 defeat against Sport Club Corinthians Paulista. Three days later, his contract was extended till December 2020. On 4 April 2018, he was loaned out to second tier Boa Esporte Clube till the end of the season.

Career statistics

References

1996 births
Living people
Association football midfielders
Brazilian footballers
Campeonato Brasileiro Série A players
Campeonato Brasileiro Série B players
Sport Club do Recife players
Boa Esporte Clube players
Associação Desportiva Confiança players
Sportspeople from Recife